Sir Wyn Lewis Williams,  (born 31 March 1951) is a Welsh judge who is the President of Welsh Tribunals. He had been a High Court judge from 2007 until his retirement on 10 February 2017.

Early life and education
Wyn Lewis Williams was born in Ferndale in the Rhondda to Ronald and Nellie Williams. Educated at Rhondda Grammar County school he matriculated at Corpus Christi College, Oxford, before entering the Inns of Court School of Law in London.

Legal career
Williams was called to the bar (Inner Temple) in 1974 and made a bencher in 2007. He practised in Cardiff from 1974 to 1988 and in London from 1988 to 2004. He became a Queen's Counsel in 1992, and served as a recorder until his appointment as a specialist Chancery judge for Wales in 2004. On 11 January 2007, Williams was appointed a High Court judge, receiving the customary knighthood, and assigned to the Queen’s Bench Division. He served as a presiding judge for the Wales Circuit and as Deputy Chairman of the Boundary Commission for Wales.

He was appointed president of Welsh tribunals in December 2017.

In February 2022 he began the Statutory Inquiry into the British Post Office scandal, projected to continue throughout 2022.

Other activities
He is active in several organisations, being president of Pendyrus Male Choir, and is closely associated with Tylorstown RFC, the rugby union club for which he played as a youth. His connection with rugby was furthered in 2012 when he was appointed as an unpaid independent chairman of the Professional Regional Game Board, an organisation set up by the Welsh Rugby Union to restructure the sport in Wales.

He is an elected Fellow of the Learned Society of Wales (FLSW).

References

1951 births
Living people
Alumni of Corpus Christi College, Oxford
Knights Bachelor
People from Ferndale, Rhondda Cynon Taf
21st-century Welsh judges
Queen's Bench Division judges
Welsh King's Counsel
20th-century King's Counsel
21st-century King's Counsel
Members of the Inner Temple
President of Welsh Tribunals
20th-century Welsh lawyers